The Civic Park, also known as the City Park, is an urban park in central Timișoara.

Location 
The Civic Park is located at the border of the former fortress of Timișoara, behind the Continental Hotel, being delimited by Carol Telbisz Street, Ion C. Brătianu Boulevard, 1989 Revolution Boulevard and Mihai Eminescu Boulevard and has an area of 76,000 m2, of which 67,500 m2 lawn and trees, 5,000 m2 alleys, and the rest, other spaces.

History 
Between 1730–1961, the Transylvanian Barracks, one of the largest military barracks in Europe, located in the vicinity of the Timișoara Fortress, operated on the land of the current park. Its demolition aimed at building a civic center with a huge opera house and administrative buildings, a project that was abandoned, being replaced by the Civic Park. Between 1968–1971, the Continental Hotel, the tallest building in Timișoara at that time, was built. During the same period, the boulevard that crosses the park was built. After 1971, here were planted, with the existing material in the city's nurseries, numerous trees, without an outlined thought.

The symbol of the park is the floral clock; its design changes twice a year.

Since 2019, the park is in a process of modernization that involves the renewal of alleys and street furniture, the construction of an ornamental fountain and the planting of nearly 1,000 trees and shrubs (pines, thujas, magnolias, lilacs, tulip trees, rhododendrons, hydrangeas, lavenders, azaleas, etc.) and almost 4,000 roses.

References 

Parks in Timișoara